The 2018 World Junior Ice Hockey Championships was the 42nd edition of the Ice Hockey World Junior Championship, and was hosted by the city of Buffalo, New York at the KeyBank Center and HarborCenter. It opened on December 26, 2017 and closed with the gold medal game on January 5, 2018. It was the sixth time that the United States has hosted the WJIHC, and the second time that Buffalo has done so, previously hosting in 2011.

A preliminary round game between Canada and the United States was played outdoors at New Era Field in nearby Orchard Park, New York on December 29, 2017. It was the second outdoor game held at any top-level IIHF world championship, the first being the opening game of the 2010 IIHF World Championship, and the first one held at a junior level.

Top Division

Venues

Host selection
On July 28, 2015, USA Hockey named the five initial finalists for hosting the event:
Buffalo, New York
Pittsburgh
St. Louis
Chicago
Tampa, Florida

Chicago and Tampa were eliminated on September 15. Buffalo was chosen as the host site on December 3, with a formal announcement on December 4.

Officials
The following officials were assigned by the International Ice Hockey Federation to officiate the 2018 World Junior Championships.

Referees
  Andris Ansons
  Alexandre Garon
  Jacob Grumsen
  Mikko Kaukokari
  Artur Kulev
  Manuel Nikolic
  Gordon Schukies
  Robin Šír
  Mikael Sjöqvist
  Stephen Thomson
  Jeremy Tufts
  Marc Wiegand

Linesmen
  Franco Castelli
  Markus Hägerström
  William Hancock II
  Rene Jensen
  Jon Kilian
  Dustin McCrank
  Jiří Ondráček
  Peter Šefčík
  Alexander Sysuev
  Emil Yletyinen

Rosters

Format
The preliminary round was a two group of five teams each internal round-robin format, followed by a three-round playoff. In the round-robin, two points were allotted for a win, and one additional point for a regulation win.  One point was allotted for an overtime or game winning shots loss.

The four highest-ranked teams from each group of the preliminary round advanced to quarterfinals while the last-placed team from each group played a best-of-three series, the loser relegated to Division IA for 2019. All other teams will retain their Top Division status.

Preliminary round 

All times are local. (Eastern Standard Time – UTC-5)

Group A

Group B

Relegation

Note:  was relegated for the 2019 World Junior Ice Hockey Championships

Playoff round

Quarterfinals

Semifinals

Bronze medal game

Gold medal game

Statistics

Scoring leaders 

GP = Games played; G = Goals; A = Assists; Pts = Points; +/− = Plus-minus; PIM = Penalties in minutesSource: IIHF

Goaltending leaders 

(minimum 40% team's total ice time)

TOI = Time On Ice (minutes:seconds); GA = Goals against; GAA = Goals against average; Sv% = Save percentage; SO = ShutoutsSource: IIHF

Tournament awards
Most Valuable Player

 Casey Mittelstadt

All-star team
 Goaltender:  Filip Gustavsson
 Defencemen:  Rasmus Dahlin,  Cale Makar
 Forwards:  Casey Mittelstadt,  Filip Zadina,  Kieffer Bellows

IIHF best player awards
 Goaltender:  Filip Gustavsson
 Defenceman:  Rasmus Dahlin
 Forward:  Casey Mittelstadt

Final standings

Division I

The Division IA tournament was held in Courchevel and Meribel, France from December 10–16, 2017. The Division IB tournament was held in Bled, Slovenia from December 9–15, 2017.  As a result of the Division IA tournament, Kazakhstan was promoted to the Top Division, and Hungary was relegated to Division IB. As a result of the Division IB tournament, Norway was promoted to Division IA, and Lithuania was relegated to Division IIA.

Division IA

Division IB

Division II

The Division IIA tournament was held in Dumfries, Great Britain from December 10–16, 2017. The Division IIB tournament was held in Belgrade, Serbia from January 10–16, 2018.  As a result of the Division IIA tournament, Japan was promoted to Division IB, and Netherlands was relegated to Division IIB.

Division IIA

Division II B

Division III

The Division III tournament was held in Sofia, Bulgaria from January 22–28, 2018. The Division III qualification tournament was held in Cape Town, South Africa from February 5–7, 2018.

Division III qualification

References

External links
 

 
2018 World Junior Ice Hockey Championships
2018 World Junior Ice Hockey Championships
2018
2018
Sports competitions in Buffalo, New York
Outdoor ice hockey games
2017–18 in American ice hockey
2017 in sports in New York (state)
2018 in sports in New York (state)
World Junior Ice Hockey
World Junior Ice Hockey
21st century in Buffalo, New York
International sports competitions in New York (state)